John Frederick Jennings (21 November 1911 – 27 February 1991) was an Australian rules footballer who played with St Kilda in the Victorian Football League (VFL).

Notes

External links 

Johnny Jennings's playing statistics from The VFA Project

1911 births
1991 deaths
Australian rules footballers from Victoria (Australia)
St Kilda Football Club players
Prahran Football Club players
Old Haileyburians Amateur Football Club players